Leucogephyra is a monotypic moth genus of the family Crambidae described by William Warren in 1896. It contains only one species, Leucogephyra semifascialis, described by the same author in the same year, which is found in Assam, India.

References

Acentropinae
Taxa named by William Warren (entomologist)
Monotypic moth genera
Moths of Asia
Crambidae genera